HMS Cambria is a Royal Naval Reserve unit associated with Cardiff; it is currently the only RNR unit in Wales. The unit was commissioned in 1947, later moving to its present site, the former Service Married Quarters at Sully. Following a rebuilding it was reopened on 15 October 1980.

in 2019, The Royal Navy commissioned the construction of a major head office and training facility at HMS Cambria to house the Royal Naval Reserve, Royal Marines Reserve and University Royal Naval Units.

References

Royal Navy shore establishments